Miya (Miyawa) is a Chadic language of the Afro-Asiatic language family spoken in Bauchi State, Nigeria. It is also referred to as "" translating to "mouth of miy". There are approximately 5,000 speakers of Miya. It is related to languages such as Hausa, which the Miya people sometimes borrow from.

Grammar

Verb morphology 
Miya's verb morphology is suprasegmental, where the masculine first person is marked with a high tone.

Noun classes 
Miya's noun class is divided between feminine and masculine, as well as a divider on morphology between animate and inanimate nouns. Noun classes where all nouns are under the class of feminine of masculine is called grammatical gender.

Notes

Further reading
 Russell G. Schuh.  1998.  A Grammar of Miya.  University of California Publications in Linguistics 130.  Berkeley:  University of California Press.

External links
Miya language materials from UCLA

West Chadic languages
Languages of Nigeria